Ramgopal Ghosh (January 15, 1815 – 25 January 1868) was a leader of the Young Bengal Group, a successful businessman, orator and social reformer. He is called the 'Demosthenes of India'. Ghosh was one of the personalities who helped John Elliot Drinkwater Bethune establish a girls' school in Calcutta.

References

1815 births
1868 deaths
Bengali Hindus
19th-century Bengalis
People from Kolkata
Presidency University, Kolkata alumni
Indian social workers
Indian social reformers
Social workers from West Bengal
Businesspeople from Kolkata
Indian businesspeople
19th-century Indian businesspeople